Commonwealth is an unincorporated community in the town of Commonwealth, Florence County, Wisconsin, United States.

History
A post office called Commonwealth was established in 1880, and remained in operation until it was discontinued in 1953. The community was named after the nearby Commonwealth Iron Mining Company.

References

Unincorporated communities in Florence County, Wisconsin
Unincorporated communities in Wisconsin
Iron Mountain micropolitan area